Adrián (or Adrià) Díaz Bronchud (born 17 September 1990) is a Spanish skating coach and retired competitive ice dancer. Initially rising to prominence on the international scene partnered with Sara Hurtado, the duo won six senior international medals and five Spanish national titles and were the first dance team to represent Spain in ISU competition. They qualified for the Olympic Games, finishing thirteenth at the 2014 Winter Olympics in Sochi, and achieving their best ISU Championship result when they placed fifth at the 2015 European Championships. 

Following the end of his partnership with Hurtado, Díaz formed a new partnership with English ice dancer Olivia Smart, with whom he was the 2021 Skate Canada International bronze medalist, a four-time Challenger Series medalist, and a three-time Spanish national champion. Smart/Díaz represented Spain at the 2022 Winter Olympics and finished seventh in their final performance at the 2022 World Championships before he retired from the sport.

Personal life 
Adrián Díaz was born on 17 September 1990 in Barcelona. He studied sports science at university. He formerly competed as Adrià Díaz but prefers to be called Adrián or Adri. He began dating American ice dancer Madison Hubbell in 2014. The couple announced their engagement in April 2018.

Skating career

Early years 
Díaz started skating in 1995. After skating in singles, he became interested in switching to ice dancing in 2006 and asked a fellow single skater, Sara Hurtado, to go with him to a summer camp organized by the Spanish federation (FEDH) with French coach Romain Haguenauer. Hurtado said, "We begged the Federation for two years, please, please, we want to do ice dance." In early 2008, FEDH hired British coach John Dunn to teach ice dancing in Madrid.

2008–2009 season: Debut of Hurtado/Díaz 
Hurtado/Díaz began competing together internationally in the 2008–09 season. Their first major international event was the 2009 World Junior Championships in Sofia, Bulgaria, where they finished thirty-second.

2009–2010 season 
Hurtado/Díaz competed in two events on the Junior Grand Prix circuit and finished sixteenth at the 2010 World Junior Championships in The Hague, Netherlands.

2010–2011 season 
Hurtado/Díaz competed on the Junior Grand Prix circuit while participating in several senior internationals. They finished fifteenth at the 2011 European Championships in Bern, Switzerland, won a bronze medal at the Bavarian Open and finished fourth at the Winter Universiade.

They placed ninth at the World Junior Championships in Gangneung, South Korea. They then competed in Moscow, Russia, at their first senior World Championships; although the two qualified for the short dance out of the preliminary round, they were unable to reach the free dance portion of the event.

2011–2012 season 
Hurtado/Díaz moved to London, England, in mid-2011 after Dunn accepted a coaching job in his native country. In November, they competed at their first-ever Grand Prix event, the 2011 Trophée Éric Bompard, where they placed eighth (last). In December 2011, they ended their relationship with Dunn and relocated to Montreal, Quebec, Canada, to train under Marie-France Dubreuil and Patrice Lauzon.

Ranked twelfth in the short dance and seventeenth in the free dance, Hurtado/Díaz finished sixteenth at the 2012 European Championships in Sheffield, England. They qualified to the free dance at the 2012 World Championships in Nice, France, and finished nineteenth overall.

2012–2013 season 
Hurtado/Díaz did not compete on the Grand Prix series. They placed fifteenth at the 2013 European Championships in Zagreb, Croatia, and nineteenth at the 2013 World Championships in London, Ontario, Canada.

2013–2014 season: Sochi Olympics 
At the 2013 Nebelhorn Trophy, Hurtado/Díaz became the first ice dancers to qualify for an Olympic entry for Spain. They had no Grand Prix assignments. In January 2014, they finished tenth at the 2014 European Championships in Budapest, Hungary, allowing Spain to send two ice dancing teams to the next Europeans.

One month later, Hurtado/Díaz competed at the Winter Olympics in Sochi, Russia; they set personal best scores in both segments and finished in thirteenth place. They ended their season with a sixteenth-place result at the 2014 World Championships in Saitama.

2014–2015 season 
Returning to the Grand Prix series, Hurtado/Díaz placed eighth at the 2014 Skate Canada International and 4th at the 2014 Trophée Éric Bompard. They then achieved career-best ISU Championship results, finishing fifth with a new personal best score at the 2015 European Championships in Stockholm, Sweden, and then fourteenth at the 2015 World Championships in Shanghai, China.

2015–2016 season: End of Hurtado/Díaz 
Hurtado/Díaz were invited to two Grand Prix events – the 2015 Trophée Éric Bompard and the 2015 Rostelecom Cup. However, on 16 October 2015, Hurtado announced on her personal Facebook page that she had decided to end the partnership. In a later interview, Hurtado stated that their partnership had experienced problems for some time and that therapy had not helped resolve these issues.

2016–2017 season: Debut of Smart/Díaz 
On 13 December 2015, it was announced that Díaz would represent Spain with British ice dancer Olivia Smart and that they would train in Montreal, Quebec, Canada. On 15 January 2016, Smart announced that the British skating association had released her.

Making their international debut, Smart/Díaz took silver behind Pogrebinsky/Benoit at the Lake Placid Ice Dance International in late July 2016. They later competed at three ISU Challenger Series events, placing fourth at the 2016 U.S. International Classic, sixth at the 2016 CS Autumn Classic International, and sixth at the 2016 CS Finlandia Trophy, before winning gold at the Open d'Andorra.

Smart/Díaz finished second to Hurtado and her new partner Kirill Khaliavin at the Spanish Championships. As a result, they were not nominated for the 2017 European Championships.

Smart/Díaz took silver in February at the Bavarian Open. Later that month, Federación Española Deportes de Hielo (FEDH) selected them to compete at the 2017 World Championships, the main Olympic-qualifying competition. The two placed 16th in the short dance, 19th in the free dance, and 18th overall at the event in Helsinki, Finland. Their result allowed Spain to send one ice dancing team to the Olympics.

2017–2018 season 
In July 2017, FEDH announced that Spain's Olympic spot would go to the team which received the highest combined score at the 2017 CS Golden Spin of Zagreb and Spanish Championships.

Smart/Díaz began their season on the Challenger Series, placing seventh at the 2017 U.S. International Figure Skating Classic and fourth at the 2017 Autumn Classic International. Making their Grand Prix debut, they placed sixth at the 2017 Skate Canada International in October. In December, they placed fifth at the 2017 CS Golden Spin of Zagreb, scoring 4.18 points less than Hurtado/Khaliavin. Later that month, they won the Spanish national title by a 3.23-point margin, resulting in a final deficit of 0.95 points. On 17 December 2017, FEDH announced that Hurtado/Khaliavin would compete at the European Championships and Olympics while Smart/Díaz would be assigned to the 2018 World Championships. They finished twelfth at the event in Milan, Italy.

2018–2019 season 
Smart/Díaz began their season at the Autumn Classic International Challenger Series event, where they placed second behind Canadians Weaver/Poje. At the onset of the 2018–19 season, they were assigned to two Grand Prix events, the Skate Canada and Internationaux de France, finishing fifth at the former and seventh at the latter.

After winning the silver medal at the Spanish Championships, finishing behind Hurtado/Khaliavin, they placed eighth at the 2019 European Championships.

2019–2020 season 
Smart/Díaz began the season with a victory at the 2019 Lake Placid Ice Dance International and then placed fourth at the 2019 CS Autumn Classic International.  At their first Grand Prix assignment, 2019 Skate America, they placed fourth, with three new personal bests set.  Smart/Díaz concluded the Grand Prix with another fourth-place finish at the 2019 Internationaux de France.

After winning the Spanish national title for the second time, they finished eighth at the 2020 European Championships, below Hurtado/Khaliavin in seventh place. Despite this, they were assigned to compete at the World Championships in Montreal, but these were cancelled as a result of the coronavirus pandemic.

2020–2021 season 
Smart/Díaz were assigned to the 2020 Skate Canada International, but this event was also cancelled due to the pandemic.

While Smart/Díaz were listed on the preliminary entry list for the 2021 World Championships, the Spanish Ice Sports Federation announced on March 2 that the final determination as to which team would represent Spain would be made following a virtual skate-off between them and Hurtado/Khaliavin.  On March 7, the Spanish federation announced that the berth had been awarded to Hurtado/Khaliavin.

2021–2022 season: Beijing Olympics 
Smart/Díaz began the Olympic season at the 2021 CS Autumn Classic International, where they won the silver medal, setting new personal best scores in the free dance and overall in the process. They beat domestic rivals Hurtado/Khaliavin by 0.25 points in the first of three matchups to determine which team would be named to the Spanish Olympic team. They then came fourth at their second event, the 2021 CS Finlandia Trophy.

Competing on the Grand Prix at the 2021 Skate America, they placed fourth in the rhythm dance, 1.27 points behind Canadian training partners Fournier Beaudry/Sørensen. They came third in the free dance but remained fourth overall by 0.54 points. Their Zorro free dance received a standing ovation from the audience, with Smart commenting that the "reaction of the crowd made it all worthwhile and so memorable." The following week at their second Grand Prix, 2021 Skate Canada International, they were third in both segments of the competition, winning the bronze medal, their first Grand Prix medal.

Smart/Díaz faced off against Hurtado/Khaliavin at the 2022 Spanish Championships and won both segments of the competition to take the gold medal with a score of 202.47, with a margin of 8.12 points over their silver medalist rivals, expanding their cumulative margin to 8.37 points. Both teams then went to the 2022 European Championships, the third and final competition for the Spanish Olympic berth. Smart/Díaz were fifth in the rhythm dance and moved up to fourth overall with a fourth-place free dance, despite a technical fall on their ending pose. Smart remarked that this season was "the hardest we've ever worked for anything. It's not only been this competition; it has been the whole season that we gave everything we had." Hurtado/Khaliavin finished in sixth place, 4.96 points back. With a cumulative margin of 13.33 points, Smart/Díaz were subsequently named to Spain's Olympic team.

Competing at the 2022 Winter Olympics in the dance event, Smart/Díaz placed ninth in the rhythm dance. They skated a new personal best in the free dance, breaking 120 points in the segment for the first time with a score of 121.41. Due to errors by higher-ranked teams Fournier Beaudry/Sørensen, Gilles/Poirier and Stepanova/Bukin they were sixth in that segment and rose to eighth overall.

Smart/Díaz finished their season at the 2022 World Championships, held in Montpellier. Russian dance teams were absent due to the International Skating Union banning all Russian athletes due to their country's invasion of Ukraine. They finished seventh, the highest ever result for a Spanish team, and finally achieving the Spanish federation's long-desired goal of earning two berths for Spanish dance teams at the World Championships.

On May 23, the Spanish federation announced that Díaz was retiring from competitive skating.

Coaching career
On June 23, 2022, the Ice Academy of Montreal announced that Díaz would be working at their London, Ontario campus as a coach and choreographer alongside former training partner Scott Moir.

His current students include:
Christina Carreira / Anthony Ponomarenko
Haley Sales / Nikolas Wamsteeker

Programs

With Smart

With Hurtado

Competitive highlights 
GP: Grand Prix; CS: Challenger Series; JGP: Junior Grand Prix

With Smart

With Hurtado

Detailed results

Small medals for short and free programs awarded only at ISU Championships.

With Smart

References

External links 

 
 
 

1990 births
Living people
Spanish male ice dancers
Sportspeople from Barcelona
Male dancers from Catalonia
Figure skaters at the 2014 Winter Olympics
Figure skaters at the 2022 Winter Olympics
Olympic figure skaters of Spain
Universiade medalists in figure skating
21st-century Spanish dancers
Universiade silver medalists for Spain
Competitors at the 2015 Winter Universiade
Competitors at the 2013 Winter Universiade
Competitors at the 2011 Winter Universiade